Mikel Kaloshi (born 16 June 1993) is an Albanian professional footballer who plays for Drenica in the Football Superleague of Kosovo.

References

1993 births
Living people
Sportspeople from Lushnjë
Association football goalkeepers
Albanian footballers
Albania youth international footballers
KS Lushnja players
KF Bylis Ballsh players
KF Gramshi players
KS Albpetrol Patos players
FK Tomori Berat players
KS Shkumbini Peqin players
KF Drenica players
Kategoria Superiore players
Kategoria e Parë players
Albanian expatriate footballers
Expatriate footballers in Kosovo
Albanian expatriate sportspeople in Kosovo